École internationale de théâtre Jacques Lecoq is a school of physical theatre located on Rue du Faubourg-Saint-Denis in the 10th arrondissement of Paris.

Founded in 1956 by Jacques Lecoq, the school offers a professional and intensive two-year course emphasizing the body, movement and space as entry points in theatrical performance and prepares its students to create collaboratively. This method is called mimodynamics. The school's graduate list includes renowned figures of stage such as Ariane Mnouchkine of Théâtre du Soleil, Steven Berkoff and Simon McBurney of Théâtre de Complicité, among others.

Program
The Lecoq program lasts for two years. Ninety students from all over the world are accepted in the first year, and out of these, thirty will be accepted into the second year. Classes are conducted in French.

Two year program
The first year focuses upon observing movement dynamics in the world and in doing so, rediscovering life anew. In the words of Jacques Lecoq:

To mime is to literally embody and therefore understand better. A person who handles bricks all day long reaches a point where he no longer knows what he is handling. It has become an automatic part of his physical life. If he is asked to mime the object, he rediscovers the meaning of the object, its weight and volume. This has interesting consequences for our teaching method: miming is a way of rediscovering a thing with renewed freshness…

Note that his method, called mimodynamics and involving corporal movement, is not miming in the traditional sense, as the spoken word is involved. The focus and the goals of mimodynamics are widely different from those of miming.

Aside from observing the world anew through the study of natural elements, materials, animals, words, sounds and colours, students also discover themselves anew with the Neutral Mask, an exercise which reveals their habits and tendencies and teaches stage presence.

The second year focuses on exploring major dramatic territories, such as melodrama, buffoon, tragedy, Commedia dell'arte clowning and so on.

Classes
In general, each day students have three sessions:
Movement analysis. This includes physical preparation – learning and analysing 20 essential movements, acrobatics, juggling, stage combat, etc.
Improvisation.
Autocours. Each Friday, students are asked to work in groups to prepare for a performance upon a certain theme related to their other classwork. The process of collaborative directing is often frustrating at first, but allows students to engage with each other creatively. In this way, students get to know each other extremely well, and also learn to work with others to create a piece of work.

Laboratory of Movement (LEM)
In addition to the two-year professional course the school also offers LEM, a course which studies space and rhythm through scenography.

Notable alumni 

Isaac Alvarez - choreographer, mime, actor, pedagogue, founder of "Théâtre du Moulinage"
Philippe Avron - actor 
Ariane Mnouchkine - director, writer and founder of Théâtre du Soleil
Steven Berkoff - playwright and actor 
Kate Brooke- screenwriter
Chris Channing- performance artist and theatre maker
Leah Cherniak - Canadian playwright and director
Avner Eisenberg - performer, teacher
Philippe Gaulier - clown, teacher and founder of L'École Philippe Gaulier
Chris Harris, English pantomime dame, director and writer
Sophie Hunter - director
Toby Jones - actor 
Joey Batey - actor and musician
William Kentridge - artist
Alex McAvoy- actor
Simon McBurney - actor, director and founder of Théâtre de Complicité
Gates McFadden – actor, choreographer
Adrian Pecknold - founder of Canadian Mime Theatre
Giovanni Fusetti - theatre pedagogue, founder of Helikos, Florence, Italy
Richard Pochinko - clown, teacher at the Theatre Resource Centre and creator of the "Canadian Clowning/Pochinko Clowning Technique"
Yasmina Reza - playwright
Geoffrey Rush - actor
Toby Sedgwick - director/actor (choreographed War Horse)
Julie Taymor – film and Broadway theatre director
Ayse Tashkiran-movement director and author on movement
Dean Gilmour - actor, director
Isla Fisher - comedian, actor
Victoria Legrand - singer, musician, member of Beach House (band)
Beejan Land,  actor
 - actress, writer and producer. Colombia. 1997.
Kani Kusruti, actress
Suzy Willson, director and co-founder of Clod Ensemble

References 

Lecoq, Jacques. (2000) The Moving Body. London: Methuen.
Lecoq, Jacques. A comprehensive overview of his pedagogy, originally published as Le Corps poétique in French

External links
 Official website, English version

Drama schools in France
Education in Paris
Educational institutions established in 1956
1956 establishments in France